Kendell Kroeker is an American politician and a former Republican member of the Wyoming House of Representatives who represented District 35 from January 11, 2011, until December 23, 2016.

Education
Kroeker earned his BS from the University of Colorado Boulder.

Elections
2012 Kroeker won the three-way August 21, 2012 Republican Primary, winning by 3 votes with 747 votes (44.0%), and was unopposed for the November 6, 2012 General election, winning with 3,717 votes.
2010 When Republican Representative Roy Cohee retired and left the District 35 seat open, Kroeker won the five-way August 17, 2010 Republican Primary with 792 votes (33.2%), and won the November 2, 2010 General election with 2,911 votes (69.4%) against Democratic nominee Jack Walts.

References

External links
Official page at the Wyoming Legislature
Campaign site
 

Place of birth missing (living people)
Year of birth missing (living people)
Living people
Republican Party members of the Wyoming House of Representatives
People from Natrona County, Wyoming
University of Colorado Boulder alumni
21st-century American politicians